Arik Air is a Nigerian airline operating mainly from two hubs at Murtala Muhammed International Airport in Lagos and Nnamdi Azikiwe International Airport in Abuja. Arik Air's head office is the Arik Air Aviation Center on the grounds of Murtala Muhammed International Airport in Ikeja. Arik Air serves a network of regional and mid-haul destinations within Africa.

History

Early years
The company was created in 2004 by Joseph Arumemi-Ikhide from the ashes of Nigeria Airways, which was liquidated in 2002.

In August 2006, the Federal Ministry of Aviation granted Arik Air authorisation to fly to Trinidad and Tobago and Amsterdam, London and Madrid in Europe. Furthermore, the airline then planned to fly to Atlanta, Miami, and Houston in the United States and Birmingham in the United Kingdom.

On 4 April 2008, Arik Air was given permission to fly to the United States by the US Department of Transportation. Arik Air started international operations to London-Heathrow on 15 December 2008, using an Airbus A340-500 aircraft wet-leased from Hi Fly. It added Johannesburg on 1 June 2009, New York JFK on 30 November 2009, and Dubai on 28 July 2014.

Subsidiary airline Arik Niger (IATA code: Q9) commenced operations in April 2009, but was shut down in February 2010.

Development since 2010
Arik Air transported its 5 millionth passenger on 6 August 2010 and it transported its 10 millionth passenger on 18 September 2012, both on flights between Johannesburg and Lagos. On 20 September 2012, the airline cancelled all its domestic operations after aviation officials raided the airline's office in Lagos, Nigeria. Flights resumed on 23 September. Arik Air had placed an order for five Boeing 777-300ER aircraft, which was cancelled in 2011. Arik Air then placed an order for two Boeing 747-8I aircraft 2013. However, in early 2017, Arik Air converted the 747-8I orders to two Boeing 787-9 Dreamliners instead. Arik Air had been the last remaining airline customer for the passenger 747-8 (who had not yet received any examples). The conversion of the 747-8 order to Dreamliners came shortly after the airline, owing to major financial stress and most aircraft not being operational, was taken over by the Asset Management Corporation of Nigeria (AMCON) at the start of 2017, deeming the airline as too big to fail. Since the takeover, all flights leaving Africa, along with flights to O.R. Tambo International Airport, have been gradually suspended. Simultaneously, KPMG was appointed by AMCON to conduct a forensic audit on Arik Air's books. Since then, AMCON is gradually in the process of reviving and stabilising the airline and its operations.

Due to Arik Air's debt, the airline is projected to merge with Aero Contractors. It has also been revealed that this new airline merger is to be re-branded as Nigeria Eagle (styled as NG Eagle), with some of the aircraft already re-painted to represent the new livery. It is speculated by many to be another attempt to re-establish a national airline by AMCON, even though they have officially dissociated any relations with the plans; stating that they were going to make a start-up airline.

Destinations

Arik Air has built up a domestic network covering mainly Nigerian and several other Western African destinations. It previously also served more distant and intercontinental destinations in the United Kingdom and the United States.

Fleet

Current fleet

As of November 2022, the Arik Air fleet consists of the following aircraft:

Former fleet

Arik Air previously operated the following aircraft:

Incidents and accidents
 On 8 March 2018, the pilot of Arik Air flight W3 304 from Lagos to Accra declared an emergency when an unknown source of smoke was detected in the cabin  from their destination. The Bombardier Dash 8 Q400 landed safely in Ghana and no passenger or crew member was injured as a result of the incident.

See also
 Transport in Nigeria
 Airlines of Africa

References

External links

 Official website

 Airlines of Nigeria
 Airlines established in 2006
 Nigerian brands
Abuja
 Companies based in Lagos
 Nigerian companies established in 2006